East Toowoomba is a residential locality in Toowoomba in the Toowoomba Region, Queensland, Australia.

Geography 
The east and south of the suburb is crossed by the Warrego Highway.

History 
Toowoomba Grammar School opened on 1 February 1877.

Toowoomba East State School opened on 17 January 1887.

The Toowoomba Preparatory School opened on 31 January 1911. It is now known as Toowoomba Anglican College.

Fairholme College opened on 1 July 1917 in East Toowoomba. The school commenced on 4 February 1908 as Spreydon College in the now-heritage listed Spreydon house in Newtown. Under the patronage of the Presbyterian Church, the school became The Presbyterian Ladies' College in January 1915. The primary school moved to the house Fairholme in East Toowoomba in July 1917 with the secondary school following in 1918. Since then the school became unofficially known as Fairholme College, but the name Fairholme College did not become official until 1978.

On Sunday 9 September 1917 the foundation stone for the Holy Angels Catholic School was laid by Archbishop James Duhig. Duhig returned on Sunday 28 January 1918 to officially open the new school. It was operated by the Sisters of the Good Samaritan. It was renamed Mater Dei Catholic Primary School in 1955.

In the  East Toowoomba had a population of 5,244 people.

Heritage listings 
There are a number of heritage-listed sites in East Toowoomba, including:
 Corner of Arthur and Mary Streets: Toowoomba East State School
 80 Campbell Street: Whyembah
 4-6 Fernside Street: Fernside
 43-79 Lindsay Street: Queens Park
 24-60 Margaret Street: Toowoomba Grammar School
 73 Margaret Street: Bishop's House
 90 Margaret Street: Old Toowoomba Court House
 124 Margaret Street: Toowoomba Technical College
 112 Mary Street: Gowrie House
 9 Phillip Street: Millbrook
 9-13 Tourist Road: Unara

Population
According to the 2016 census of Population, there were  5,244 people in East Toowoomba.
 Aboriginal and Torres Strait Islander people made up 2.7% of the population. 
 80.1% of people were born in Australia. The next most common country of birth was England at 2.6%.   
 86.6% of people spoke only English at home.. 
 The most common responses for religion were No Religion 25.7%, Catholic 23.6% and Anglican 18.9%.

Education

Toowoomba East State School is a government primary (Prep-6) school for boys and girls at Cnr Arthur & Mary Streets. In 2018, the school had an enrolment of 859 students with 60 teachers (51 full-time equivalent) and 25 non-teaching staff (17 full-time equivalent). It includes a special education program.

Mater Dei Primary School is a Catholic primary (Prep-6) school for boys and girls at 53 Curzon Street. In 2018, the school had an enrolment of 438 students with 34 teachers (26 full-time equivalent) and 20 non-teaching staff (11 full-time equivalent).

Toowoomba Grammar School is a private primary and secondary (Prep-12) school for boys at 24 Margaret Street. In 2018, the school had an enrolment of 1176 students with 100 teachers (96 full-time equivalent) and 85 non-teaching staff (53 full-time equivalent).

Fairholme College is a private primary and secondary (Prep-12) school for girls at 40 Wirra Wirra Street. In 2018, the school had an enrolment of 686 students with 68 teachers (62 full-time equivalent) and 56 non-teaching staff (36 full-time equivalent).

Toowoomba Anglican College is a private primary and secondary (Prep-11) school for boys and girls at 2 Campbell Street. In 2018, the school had an enrolment of 520 students with 46 teachers (38 full-time equivalent) and 35 non-teaching staff (24 full-time equivalent).

The suburb contains the main Bridge Street campus of Southern Queensland Institute of TAFE.

Facilities
 Clive Berghofer Stadium, previously known as Athletic Oval and named for former Toowoomba mayor Clive Berghofer (1982–1992), and primarily used for rugby league games. It is also the home ground for South West Queensland Thunder FC who compete in the National Premier Leagues Queensland;
 St Vincent's Hospital, a private hospital established in 1922 by the Sisters of Charity;
 Queens Park and Botanical Gardens, a heritage-listed reserve established in 1869. Queens Park is the hub of Carnival of the Flowers (Toowoomba), including the Food and Wine festival, a Sideshow Alley and the finishing point for the Carnival Parade.
Cobb & Co Museum, located on Lindsay Street in between Toowoomba TAFE and Queens Park.

References

 
Suburbs of Toowoomba
Localities in Queensland

External links